(Give peace, Lord) is a choral composition  by Arvo Pärt on the Latin prayer for peace Da pacem Domine, first composed in 2004 for four voices. Different versions, also for and with string instruments, were published by Universal Edition.

History 

The work was commissioned by Jordi Savall for a peace concert in Barcelona on 1 July 2004. Pärt began the composition two days after the 2004 Madrid train bombings, in memory of the victims. It was first recorded on 29 March 2005 by the Hilliard Ensemble in St. Gerold, Austria. In Spain, it has been performed annually to commemorate the victims.

It was originally set for four voices. Pärt later wrote several versions, also for voices and string orchestra, and for instruments alone, string quartet or string orchestra. They were published by Universal Edition. The first performance for the version for voices and string orchestra was in Tallinn on 18 May 2007 at the Niguliste Church, with the Estonian Philharmonic Chamber Choir and the Tallinn Chamber Orchestra, conducted by Tõnu Kaljuste.

The music critic and writer David Vernier commented on the composer's subtle techniques of composition, forming the structure of the music from "elemental materials" such as "sonority, voicing, and rudimentary harmonies". Vernier noted "an almost complete subordination of rhythmic influence and the relegation of melody to a more or less implied presence".

A review of The New York Times mentioned the composer's "temporal rootlessness" and continued:

Selected recordings 

 , Hilliard Ensemble, 2005
 , Estonian Philharmonic Chamber Choir, Paul Hillier, 2006
 , Estonian Philharmonic Chamber Choir, Tõnu Kaljuste, 2009

References

External links 

 Da pacem Domine text and translations in the Choral Public Domain Library
 between sound and space / Arvo Pärt: Lamentate (ECM New Series 1930) ECM Records resource, 2014

Compositions by Arvo Pärt
2004 compositions
Choral compositions
Contemporary classical compositions